YU zlato (trans. YU Gold) is a compilation album by Serbian and former Yugoslav rock band YU Grupa, released in 1976. The album features songs from the band's 7-inch singles released in the 1971–1976 period.

YU zlato features some of the band's biggest hits: "Čudna šuma", "Šta će meni vatra", "U tami disko kluba", folk-oriented "Nona", "Kosovski božuri" and "Sama", and the cult ballad "Crni leptir". However, only two of the songs from YU zlato, "Čudna šuma" and "Crni leptir", have been, beside on a 7-inch single, published on a studio album (both on the band's 1973 self-titled debut).

The album was polled in 1998 as the 57th on the list of 100 greatest Yugoslav rock and pop albums in the book YU 100: najbolji albumi jugoslovenske rok i pop muzike (YU 100: The Best albums of Yugoslav pop and rock music).

Track listing

1996 reissue bonus tracks

Credits
Dragi Jelić – guitar, vocals
Žika Jelić – bass guitar, vocals
Miodrag Okrugić – organ
Velibor Bogdanović – drums
Bata Kostić – guitar
Ratislav Đelmaš – drums

Reissues
In 1996, the album was reissued on CD by the Hi-Fi Centar record label. The rerelease featured three bonus tracks, "Trenutak sna", "Devojko mala" and "More", all three from the bands 1973 debut album, and an alternate cover. The cover featured a photograph originally used on a cover of the band's 1975 self-titled album.

Legacy
The album was polled in 1998 as the 57th on the list of 100 greatest Yugoslav rock and pop albums in the book YU 100: najbolji albumi jugoslovenske rok i pop muzike (YU 100: The Best albums of Yugoslav pop and rock music).

References 

YU zlato at Discogs
 EX YU ROCK enciklopedija 1960-2006,  Janjatović Petar;

External links 
YU zlato at Discogs

YU Grupa compilation albums
1976 compilation albums
Jugoton compilation albums